The Cathedral of Our Lady of the Snows is the principal church and cathedral of the City of Ibiza (Eivissa).

History 

In 1234, the future conquerors of the island, Guillermo de Montgrí, Peter of Portugal and Nuno Sanç, signed an agreement stipulating that establishing a parish dedicated to Saint Mary would be one of their first obligations upon conquest. As a result, the parish was established once the City of Eivissa was taken on August 8, 1235.

The existing structure is the result of numerous changes to the original building, including additions to the east side that include a trapezoidal bell tower and a polygonal apse with its five chapels. It is a very solid building, built in the Catalan Gothic style in the 16th century.

In 1435, the church had five chapels, dedicated to Saint James and Saint Michael, to Saint Tecla and Saint Anthony, to Saint John Baptist and Saint John Evangelist and to Saint Peter and Saint Paul. A new nave was built at the end of the 15th century, finished off with the Fonda chapel made by the Francolins in 1538.

In the 18th century, the church was heavily refurbished, as a result of the bad condition of the structure. The works were directed by Jaume Espinosa and Pere Ferro, who were the obrers de la vila (Town Builders). The renovations took place between 1715 and 1728. In 1782, Pope Pius VI established the episcopal see of Ibiza and the medieval church, renovated, became the cathedral. It nonetheless remains perpetually suffragan to Tarragona—as it had been as a parish—because of the Catalan origin of its old Christian conquerors.

Today, the cathedral keeps many works of art, among which are several notable pieces: a Gothic monstrance of golden silver, made by Francesc Martí in 1399, two Gothic panels of Saint Tecla and Saint Anthony, painted by Francesc Cornes in the 14th century, and another two—from the 15th century—by the master Valentí Montoliu that represent Saint James and Saint Matthew.

References 

Official Ibiza tourist information website - Catedral de Ibiza - Monuments
Consell Insular d'Eivissa 
The Cathedral on GCatholics.com

13th-century Roman Catholic church buildings in Spain
Ibiza
Churches in the Balearic Islands
Buildings and structures in Ibiza
Baroque architecture in the Balearic Islands
Gothic architecture in the Balearic Islands